Baldwin Lake is a lake on the Mississippi River in Anoka County, Minnesota.

References

Lakes of Minnesota
Lakes of Anoka County, Minnesota
Lakes of the Mississippi River